Thyenula magna is a jumping spider species in the genus Thyenula that lives in South Africa. Only the male has been described.

References

Endemic fauna of South Africa
Salticidae
Spiders described in 2009
Spiders of South Africa